The Kamin-2 missile system, also known as the Mersad 16 and Tactical Mersad is an Iranian road-mobile short-range air defense system derived from the Mersad air defense system. It was unveiled on a Defense exhibition that took place on 18 April 2018. It is designed reconnaissance and strike unmanned aerial vehicles (UAVs) as well as manned airplanes and helicopters flying at low altitudes. Iranian army airborne commander Yousef Qorbani had stated that this missile had its range doubled compared to the previous Mersad air defense system, he stated that due to the regional threats that Iran is facing, such weapons can be highly effective in short-range combat zones.

References 

Surface-to-air missiles of Iran
21st-century surface-to-air missiles
Guided missiles of Iran